Alcóntar is a municipality of Almería province, in Spain.

Demographics

References

External links
  Alcóntar - Diputación Provincial de Almería
 El Molino de Alcóntar (Archived 2009-10-25) House of Rural Tourism. Contains touristic information on the village and the surrounding area (in Spanish).

Municipalities in the Province of Almería